Milovan Gavazzi (18 March 1895 – 20 January 1992) was a Croatian  ethnographer.

Two awards of the Croatian Ethnographic Society are named after him: the annual award and lifetime achievements award, in ethnology.

In 1992, the entire private library (over 1500 volumes of journals and over 1600 books) of Milovan Gavazzi was donated to the library of the Department of Ethnology, Zagreb.

Monographs
Godina dana hrvatskih narodnih običaja (1939) (free download from scribd)
Vrela i sudbine narodnih tradicija (1978)
Baština hrvatskog sela (1991)
Izabrani radovi s podrucja glazbe (1919-1976), 1988,

References

1895 births
1992 deaths
Croatian ethnologists
People from Gospić
Herder Prize recipients
Yugoslav ethnographers